Thyamagondlu  is a village in the state of Karnataka in southern India. It is located in the Nelamangala taluk of Bangalore Rural district.

Demographics
 India census, Thyamagondlu had a population of 8186 with 4208 males and 3978 females.

See also
 Bangalore Rural
 Districts of Karnataka

References

External links
 http://Bangalorerural.nic.in/

Villages in Bangalore Rural district